Callonema may refer to:
 Callonema (alga), a genus in the family Stylonemataceae
 Callonema (gastropod), a genus in the family Elasmonematidae

See also 
 Calonema, a synonym for Caladenia, the spider orchids